Giff Smith (born October 12, 1968) is an American football outside linebacker coach in the National Football League (NFL). He served as the defensive line coach for the Buffalo Bills from 2011 to 2012. He was dismissed, along with the entire Bills coaching staff, on December 31, 2012. He is credited with helping with the emergence of Kyle Williams.

References

External links
 San Diego Chargers profile

1968 births
Living people
Arkansas Razorbacks football coaches
Buffalo Bills coaches
Georgia Bulldogs football coaches
Georgia Southern Eagles football coaches
Georgia Southern Eagles football players
Georgia Tech Yellow Jackets football coaches
Los Angeles Chargers coaches
San Diego Chargers coaches
Tennessee Titans coaches
Tulane Green Wave football coaches
Sportspeople from Cobb County, Georgia
Coaches of American football from Georgia (U.S. state)
Players of American football from Georgia (U.S. state)